Nicolaus Laurentii (–1486) is the Latin form of the name of Niccolò di Lorenzo, also known as Niccolò Todesco ("Nicholas the German"). He was a German printer who lived in Florence, Italy in the late fifteenth century. He was among the first printers to use copper plate engravings and printed a number of works of importance to the Italian Renaissance.

Biography
Laurentii moved to Florence from Wroclaw (today Poland). He worked with Johannes Petri of Mainz in a nunnery of the Dominican Order. The sisters there served as compositors and printers.

Among the works printed by Laurentii are Cristoforo Landino's commentary to  The Divine Comedy by Dante Alighieri (which had been printed for the first time in 1472) and the Septe Giornate della Geographia di Francesco Berlinghieri by Francesco Berlinghieri, which was one of the first printed works based upon Ptolemy's Geographica.

Works printed

Nicolaus Laurentii's printed works include:

Marsilio Ficino, De christiana religione (1476)
Antonio Bettini, Monte Santo di Dio (1477)
Aulus Cornelius Celsus, De medicina (1478)
Dante Alighieri, La Commedia (1481)
Francesco Berlinghieri, Septe Giornate della Geographia di Francesco Berlinghieri (1482)
Leon Battista Alberti, De Re Aedificatoria (1485)

References

"Printers and Printing, 15th Century."  Encyclopedia of Library and Information Science.  Vol. 23.  CRC Press, 1978.
Roberto Ridolfi.  “Contributi sopra Niccolò Todesco,” La Bibliofilia, vol. 58, no. 1, 1956, pp. 1–14.
Roberto Ridolfi. “Le Ultime imprese tipografiche di Niccolò Todesco,” La Bibliofilia, vol. 68, no. 2, 1966,  pp. 140–151.

Italian printers
Printers of incunabula
15th-century Italian businesspeople